The  is an interchange of the Tōmei Expressway, Meishin Expressway and Nagoya Expressway Route 11 in Komaki, Aichi, Japan. This is the ending point of the Tomei Expressway and the starting point of the Meishin Expressway.

This is one of the closest interchanges to Nagoya.

Roads
 Tōmei Expressway (Asian Highway Network)
 Meishin Expressway (Asian Highway Network)
 Nagoya Expressway Route 11 (Komaki Route)

History
July 1, 1965: The interchange opened.
April 25, 1968: Tomei Expressway was opened and connected.
October 19, 2001: Nagoya Expressway Route 11 was opened and connected.

Around
Mount Komaki
Nagoya Airfield
Park Arena Komaki

References

External links
Central Nippon Expressway Company (official website)

Roads in Aichi Prefecture